The 1950 Minnesota gubernatorial election took place on November 7, 1950. Republican Party of Minnesota candidate Luther Youngdahl defeated Minnesota Democratic–Farmer–Labor Party challenger Harry H. Peterson.

, this marks the last time the following counties have voted Republican in a gubernatorial election: Carlton, Lake, and St. Louis.

Results

See also
 List of Minnesota gubernatorial elections

External links
 http://www.sos.state.mn.us/home/index.asp?page=653
 http://www.sos.state.mn.us/home/index.asp?page=657

1950
Minnesota
Gubernatorial
November 1950 events in the United States